Top rope climbing (or top roping) is a type of rock climbing where the climber is securely attached to a rope that runs through a fixed anchor at the top of the climbing route, and back down to the belayer (or "second") at the base of the climb.  Should the climber fall they will just hang from the rope at the point of the fall.  They can then either resume their climb or have the belayer lower them down in a controlled manner to the base of the climb.

Top roping is one of the relatively safest forms of rock climbing and is used by most beginners and novices of the sport. Before the era of sport climbing, top roping a route for practice (known as headpointing or hangdogging) was considered poor practice, however, it is now a legitimate technique in preparing for a redpoint ascent.  Top toping new a route is not considered a first free ascent of a climb, and because of the ability of the belayer to give aid to the climber, it is not strictly free climbing (although some advocate that with slack, it is free climbing).

Description

In top-roping, the climber and their belayer (or "second"), arrange a fixed anchor at the top of the climb and then hang the rope down from this anchor at the rope's approximate mid-point (i.e. so that two parts of the rope are now hanging down the route). The climber is then tied to one end of the rope (using a figure-eight loop follow-through knot), and the belayer clips their belay device into the other side of the hanging rope.  As the climber ascends the route, the belayer can "take in" the "slack" in the rope, so that if the climber falls, they simply hang from the rope, unlike a lead climber who falls at least twice the distance to their last point of climbing protection. 

If the belayer takes-in all the slack on the rope, and maintains a high level of tautness in the rope, then they are giving the climber a source of artificial aid in ascending the route.  A physically strong belayer, or a belayer with a light climber (i.e. a child), can physically haul the climber up the route by pulling on the rope.  Because of this aid that the belayer can give the climber, top roping is not considered free climbing (and nor is it considered lead climbing), and a top rope ascent cannot be used to claim a first free ascent (FFA) of a new climb.

Use by leading climbers

Before the arrival of sport climbing in the mid-1980s, practicing a traditional climbing route using a top rope before attempting to free climb the route, was considered poor practice. A first free ascent, where the climber had practiced the route on a top rope (called headpointing and hangdogging), was noted in guidebooks to record its lesser status.  When the sport climbing definition of an FFA — the redpoint — became the standard definition in rock climbing, such distinctions were dropped; leading climbers now make extensive legimitate use of hangdogging and headpointing top-roping techniques in preparing for redpoint FFAs.

In the 1998 climbing film Hard Grit, leading British traditional climber Johnny Dawes advocated for the use of a top rope — with enough slack in the rope to avoid any implication of aid — to qualify as a free ascent on extreme traditional climbing routes, however, his view was not adopted by the wider climbing community.

Equipment

In common with lead climbing, top roping requires the standard equipment of a harness attached to one end of a dynamic kernmantle rope (usually via a figure-eight knot).  The second, who is belaying, will use a mechanical belay device that is clipped-into the rope, and which pays-out the rope as needed, but can grip the rope tightly to catch the climber in the event of a fall.

Top roping requires a fixed anchor at the top of the climb, from which two sides of the rope can be hung back down to the base.  Because top roping is either done by novice climbers, or by experienced climbers attempting a route at the limit of their capabilities (why they need to practice it), there is a high probability that the anchor will experience a load, and it, therefore, needs to be strong.  Some climbing areas place fixed artificial anchors (i.e. iron rings or cement blocks) at the top of routes to assist top rope climbers in creating a strong fixed anchor.

Top rope solo climbing

Top rope solo climbing, is where a single-length static fixed rope, anchored to the top of the route, is laid along the length of the climb (unlike normal top roping, the two sides of the rope are not needed).  The climber then clips-into the fixed rope using at least one progress capture device (PCD) such as a Petzl Micro Traxion or a Camp Lift, that will allow the rope to pay-through as the climber ascends but will grip the rope tightly in the event of a fall.  

Big wall climbing can also use top rope solo climbing for the "second" (and other non-lead climbers), to speed up their follow-on ascent, and give the lead climber time to rest and/or look after other tasks (i.e. gear hauling).

See also

Aid climbing
Competition climbing

References

External links
Top Rope Belay Setup Overview, Cornell University (2023)

Types of climbing
Climbing techniques
Articles containing video clips